Tour of the Universe: Barcelona 20/21.11.09 is a live video album by English electronic music band Depeche Mode, released on 5 November 2010 by Mute Records. It was filmed at Palau Sant Jordi in Barcelona, Spain on 20 and 21 November 2009 during the band's 2009–10 worldwide Tour of the Universe. It is the first Blu-ray release by the band.

This concert film was released in three formats: the standard edition including the concert DVD and the two audio CDs, the deluxe edition with additional special features DVD and the two audio CDs, and a Blu-ray Disc with the concert and special features.

Track listing

DVD 1 – Main concert

Deluxe edition DVD 2 – Special features

CD 1

CD 2

Personnel
Credits adapted from the liner notes of the deluxe edition of Tour of the Universe: Barcelona 20/21.11.09.

 Joe Adams – mix assistance, Pro Tools editing
 Anne Carruthers – audio co-ordination, production
 John Catlin – mix assistance, Pro Tools editing
 Anton Corbijn – film director 
 Caitlin Cresswell – recording technical engineering
 Christian Eigner – drums, mixing
 JD Fanger – Depeche Mode office
 Chris Goddard – recording technical engineering
 Peter Gordeno – keyboards
 Dan Goudie – mix assistance, Pro Tools editing
 Simon Heyworth – mastering
 Kim Hiorthøy – front cover symbol (based on original design by Anton Corbijn)
 Kerry Hopwood – mixing, programming

 Jonathan Kessler – management
 Antony King – mixing
 David "Skippi" Loudoun – mix assistance, Pro Tools editing, recording technical engineering
 Catherine Marks – mix assistance, Pro Tools editing
 MJ – audio co-ordination, production
 Kevin Paul – mixing
 Jim Parsons – film producer 
 Will Shapland – recording
 ShaughnessyWorks – packaging design
 Daniel Simmons – digital artwork
 P.A. Taylor – packaging design
 Russell Thomas – film director

Charts

Weekly charts

Year-end charts

Certifications

Release history

References

2010 live albums
2010 video albums
Depeche Mode video albums
Live video albums
Mute Records live albums
Mute Records video albums